is a Japanese professional basketball player for the Bambitious Nara of the B.League in Japan.

Career statistics 

|-
| align="left" | 2013-14
| align="left" | Toyota
| 12|| || 8.5|| .414|| .000|| .526|| 0.7|| 1.5|| 0.3|| 0.1||  2.8
|-
| align="left" | 2014-15
| align="left" | Toyota
| 47|| 1|| 14.8|| .363|| .000|| .706|| 1.2|| 1.9|| 0.4|| 0.1||3.8
|-
| align="left" | 2015-16
| align="left" | Toyota
| 55||3 ||15.7 ||.422 ||.333 ||.698 ||1.4 ||1.9 ||0.4 ||0.1 ||3.4
|-
| align="left" | 2016-17
| align="left" | Toyama
| 60||47 ||29.6 ||.416 ||.290 ||.763 ||4.0 ||bgcolor="CFECEC"|4.2* ||1.2 ||0.2 ||9.4
|-
| align="left" | 2017-18
| align="left" | Toyama
| 59||58 ||34.5 ||.453 ||.222 ||.787 ||4.7 ||bgcolor="CFECEC"|7.7* ||1.2 ||0.1 ||17.0
|-
|}

References

1991 births
Living people
Alvark Tokyo players
Japanese men's basketball players
Senshu University alumni
Sportspeople from Aichi Prefecture
Toyama Grouses players
Point guards